The Bureau of the Fiscal Service (Fiscal Service) is a bureau of the U.S. Department of the Treasury. The Fiscal Service replaced the Bureau of the Public Debt and the Financial Management Service effective October 7, 2012 by directive of Treasury Secretary Timothy Geithner.

The Bureau manages the government's accounting, central payment systems, and public debt.

Among some of its better known duties is to collect any voluntary donations made to the government for reduction of the public debt. The amount of such reductions has hovered around two million dollars per year, and have been widely variable. By comparison, the annual compounding interest on US government debt in the year 2022 has been projected to be about $305B, making it some 152500 times greater than the amount of voluntary donations to the treasury.

See also
 Title 31 of the Code of Federal Regulations
 TreasuryDirect
 United States Treasury security

References

External links 
 
Treasury Order 136-01, which created the Fiscal Service

United States Department of the Treasury agencies